HC Sarov is an ice hockey team in Sarov, Russia. They play in the Supreme Hockey League, the second level of Russian ice hockey. The club was founded in 2002.

External links
Official site

Ice hockey teams in Russia
Ice hockey clubs established in 2002
2002 establishments in Russia